The Letter of 40 intellectuals, also The letter of 40, originally A public letter from Estonian SSR was a public letter dated October 28, 1980 and posted a week later, in which 40 intellectuals attempted to defend the Estonian language and expressed their protest against the recklessness of the Republic-level government in dealing with youth protests that were sparked a week earlier due to the banning of a public performance of the band Propeller. The real reasons were much more deep-seated, and had to do primarily with the Russification policies of the Kremlin in occupied Estonia.

The letter was addressed to the newspapers Pravda, Rahva Hääl and Sovetskaya Estoniya. None of these nor any other Soviet publication printed the letter.  Copies of the letter were however widely distributed through self-publishing.

Publication 
The letter was first published abroad on December 10, 1980 in Eesti Päevaleht (Stockholm), a weekly newspaper run by Estonians in exile. At the same time that the letter circulated in Estonian exile communities, radio stations in other countries broadcast the contents of the letter.  Radio Free Europe read the letter in full on 11 December 1980 in the Estonian language, and later also transmitted it in translated form in other languages.  Voice of America did a thorough overview on December 23, 1980.  This distribution round, in turn, led to a number of tertiary copies, meaning hand-written transcripts of the reading from the broadcasts began to circulate underground in Estonia.

The letter was translated into English by Jüri Estam. Dr. Jaan Pennar contributed editing.

In Estonia, the letter was first officially published in Vikerkaar (no. 7, 1988), together with commentary by Rein Ruutsoo and Lembit Valt.

Soviet reaction 
In November 1980, the Soviet government took a number of repressive measures against the signatories: they were "interviewed" at work and by various Party structures, and invited to renounce their signatures.  A number of signatories did so.

The Soviet KGB conducted a search at the home of Jaan Kaplinski, whom it suspected to have been the originator of the letter.

Academician Gustav Naan in turn sent a letter entitled "Some Thoughts About the Ideological Situation" to the Central Committee of the Communist Party of Estonia, demanding reprisals against what he described as the “gang of forty”.

Four signatories were fired from their jobs.

Other repressions were not undertaken against the signatories.  The KGB attempted but failed to track down people who had sent copies of the letter out of the country.

Signatories 

Priit Aimla
Kaur Alttoa
Madis Aruja 
Lehte Hainsalu
Mati Hint
Fred Jüssi
Aira Kaal
Maie Kalda
Tõnu Kaljuste
Toomas Kall
Jaan Kaplinski
Peet Kask
Heino Kiik
Jaan Klõšeiko
Kersti Kreismann
Alar Laats
Aare Laht
Andres Langemets
Marju Lauristin
Peeter Lorents
Vello Lõugas
Endel Nirk
Lembit Peterson
Arno Pukk
Rein Põllumaa
Tõnis Rätsep
Paul-Eerik Rummo
Rein Ruutsoo
Ita Saks
Aavo Sirk
Mati Sirkel
Jaan Tamm
Rein Tamsalu
Andres Tarand
Lehte Tavel
Peeter Tulviste
Mati Unt
Arvo Valton
Juhan Viiding 
Aarne Üksküla

Footnotes

Literature 
 Text of the Letter of 40 in English 
 40 kirja lugu by Sirje Kiin, Rein Ruutsoo and Andres Tarand.  Olion 1990, 
 Rein Ruutsoo: Tartu Ülikool ja 40 kiri: kodanikuühiskond Eestis ja vastupanu strateegiad, no. 31 in Tartu Ülikooli ajaloo küsimusi, pages 144–181
 Andres Tarand: Kiri ei põle ära: päevaraamat 1980–..., Eesti Päevalehe Kirjastus 2005, 

Open letters
1980 in the Soviet Union
Works originally published in newspapers
1980 documents
1980 in Estonia